Immaculate Conception Church and Rectory is a former Catholic church and adjacent rectory in St. Louis, Missouri, United States. It is the home of the Compton Heights Concert Band.  The former church and rectory are listed on the National Register of Historic Places.

History

Immaculate Conception was the name of three different churches in the city of St. Louis at different periods of time.  The first church was built at Eighth and Chestnut Streets in 1854. It was forced to close from damage and potential danger by the tunnels that were dug beneath it. The parish was re-established in 1874 at Jefferson and Lucas Streets.  The second parish was suppressed by Archbishop John Joseph Kain in 1902. Six years later what had been St. Kevin's Parish was renamed Immaculate Conception when the present church building was constructed.

The original St. Kevin's Church was built in 1876 at Park Street and Cardinal Avenue.  By 1904 the parish was in need of a larger church. They decided to relocate to the corner of Lafayette and Longfellow. The United States had been placed under the patronage of the Blessed Virgin Mary under her title of the Immaculate Conception.  It was decided to rename the parish Immaculate Conception/St. Kevin. The former St. Kevin's church building was converted for use as the parish school, which was served by the Sisters of Loretto. In time the parish dropped St. Kevin from its name and became known simply as Immaculate Conception.

In 1977, St. Henry Church (founded in 1885) merged with Immaculate Conception.  The parish became known as Immaculate Conception/St. Henry's and was staffed by the Augustinians.  The former St. Henry's Church at Rutger and California Streets was destroyed as a result of two fires in the mid 1990s and had to be torn down.  The Catholic population in the area declined over the years and the parish was closed in 2005. The church and rectory were purchased for use by the Compton Heights Concert Band.  They were listed on the National Register of Historic Places in 2008.

Architecture
The St. Louis architectural firm of Barnett, Haynes & Barnett designed the Gothic Revival style buildings.  Around the same time they designed the Cathedral Basilica of Saint Louis.  The church was constructed of stone.  It features three rose windows and a soaring interior.

See also
Immaculate Conception School (St. Louis, Missouri)

References

Roman Catholic churches completed in 1908
Roman Catholic churches in St. Louis
Former Roman Catholic church buildings in Missouri
Churches on the National Register of Historic Places in Missouri
National Register of Historic Places in St. Louis
1874 establishments in Missouri
Buildings and structures in St. Louis
Tourist attractions in St. Louis
20th-century Roman Catholic church buildings in the United States
Gothic Revival church buildings in Missouri